Kimberly O. Johnson is an American politician. She is a former member of the South Carolina House of Representatives from the 64th District, serving since 2020. She is a member of the Democratic party. She was defeated by Republican challenger Fawn Pedalino in the 2022 general election.

References

21st-century African-American politicians
21st-century American politicians
African-American people in South Carolina politics
Living people
Democratic Party members of the South Carolina House of Representatives
University of South Carolina alumni
Year of birth missing (living people)

Women state legislators in South Carolina